Day'Ron Yusha Sharpe (born November 6, 2001) is an American professional basketball player for the Brooklyn Nets of the National Basketball Association (NBA). He played college basketball for the North Carolina Tar Heels.

High school career
Sharpe began his high school career playing for South Central High School in Winterville, North Carolina. As a sophomore, he averaged 14.3 points and 9.3 rebounds per game. Sharpe averaged 16.5 points and 10.7 rebounds per game as a junior, helping South Central finish with a 30–1 record and win the NCHSAA Class 4A state title. He announced he was transferring to Montverde Academy for his senior season. Sharpe averaged 12.1 points and 7.3 rebounds per game as a senior, leading Montverde to a 25–0 record and No. 1 national ranking according to MaxPreps. He was named a McDonald's All-American as well as a Jordan Brand All-American. In AAU play, he played for Garner Road.

Recruiting
Sharpe was considered a five-star recruit ranked the No. 5 center in the class of 2020 and the No. 22 overall player by 247Sports. He committed to North Carolina on June 17, 2018, becoming the first member of the class of 2020 to commit to the Tar Heels. Sharpe turned down scholarship offers from Virginia, East Carolina and Georgetown.

College career
In Sharpe's freshman debut on November 25, 2020, he had 13 points and 10 rebounds in a 79–60 win against College of Charleston. He become the fourth North Carolina player to record a double-double in his debut game, joining Lennie Rosenbluth, Sam Perkins, and Cole Anthony. Sharpe averaged 9.5 points and 7.6 rebounds per game as a freshman. On March 24, 2021, Sharpe declared for the 2021 NBA draft.

Professional career
Sharpe was selected with the 29th pick in the 2021 NBA draft by the Phoenix Suns. On August 6, 2021, Jevon Carter and the draft rights to Sharpe were traded to the Brooklyn Nets in exchange for Landry Shamet.

On January 13, the Nets beat the Bulls 138–112. In this game, Sharpe played 21 minutes, made 10 of 14 shots, scored 20 points, had 7 rebounds and 1 block. The 20 points in this game set a new personal season high (his previous record was 14 points, against the Trail Blazers on January 11, 2022).

Career statistics

NBA

Regular season

|-
| style="text-align:left;"| 
| style="text-align:left;"| Brooklyn
| 32 || 8 || 12.2 || .577 || .286 || .585 || 5.0 || .5 || .3 || .5 || 6.2
|- class="sortbottom"
| style="text-align:center;" colspan="2"| Career
| 32 || 8 || 12.2 || .577 || .286 || .585 || 5.0 || .5 || .3 || .5 || 6.2

Playoffs

|-
| style="text-align:left;"|2022
| style="text-align:left;"|Brooklyn
| 1 || 0 || 0.0 || — || — || — || .0 || .0 || .0 || .0 || .0
|- class="sortbottom"
| style="text-align:center;" colspan="2"|Career
| 1 || 0 || 0.0 || — || — || — || .0 || .0 || .0 || .0 || .0

College

|-
| style="text-align:left;"| 2020–21
| style="text-align:left;"| North Carolina
| 29 || 4 || 19.2 || .519 || .000 || .505 || 7.6 || 1.4 || .8 || .9 || 9.5

Personal life
Sharpe was born in Greenville, North Carolina. He was an honor student and also plays piano.

References

External links
North Carolina Tar Heels bio
Montverde Academy Eagles bio
USA Basketball bio

2001 births
Living people
21st-century African-American sportspeople
African-American basketball players
American men's basketball players
Basketball players from North Carolina
Brooklyn Nets players
Centers (basketball)
Long Island Nets players
Montverde Academy alumni
North Carolina Tar Heels men's basketball players
Phoenix Suns draft picks
Power forwards (basketball)
Sportspeople from Greenville, North Carolina